Eugen Meier (born 18 June 1934) is a Swiss composer and conductor. He was born in Würenlingen.

References

1934 births
Living people
Swiss composers
People from Baden District, Aargau
Swiss conductors (music)